Tesco Vee (born Robert Vermeulen; August 26, 1955) is an American, Michigan-based punk rock musician, and co-founder of Touch and Go Records zine. Born in Kalamazoo, Michigan, he is a former elementary school teacher and the founding member, and front man, of punk bands The Meatmen, Tesco Vee's Hate Police, Blight, and Dutch Hercules.

History
In 1979, while working as a third- and fifth-grade teacher in Williamston, Michigan, Tesco Vee and his friend Dave Stimson self-wrote and self-printed Touch and Go, a Lansing-based zine, and one of the pioneering punk and hardcore punk zines. It featured politically incorrect, and often crude humor, alongside album and single reviews of Black Flag, Minor Threat and Bad Brains.

In 1981, Touch and Go also became a small label, releasing vinyl singles by The Necros, Meatmen and Negative Approach.

Touch and Go (as a zine) folded after 22 issues and a few limited-release punk singles. It was then taken over by Corey Rusk (of The Necros), who moved the label to Chicago and grew it into an international success - signing bands such as the Butthole Surfers, Jesus Lizard and TV on the Radio. Rusk continued operations of the label until 2008.

After handing Touch and Go over to Rusk in 1983, Tesco moved to Washington, DC, and began to focus on his own punk band, The Meatmen - who played shows until 1996. In 1999, Tesco and his family moved back to the Lansing, Michigan, area. In 2007, Tesco began playing Meatmen shows again with a new lineup of Michigan musicians.

In 2010, Tesco Vee reformed Tesco Vee's Hate Police and eventually recast and toured with The Meatmen. He is also promoting Touch and Go: The Complete Hardcore Punk Zine '79-'83" - a book released on June 30, 2010 that chronicles all 22 issues of the Touch and Go zine in one trade paper back book. In 2014, he collaborated with Blowfly on his album Black in the Sack.

In 2022 Tesco Vee opened a toy shop in Lansing, Michigan where he sells parts of his extensive collection of toys from the 1940s to the 1980s.

References

External links
AMG bio: Meatmen Accessed July 6, 2010
Pitchfork Media: T&G zine on Pitchfork Accessed July 6, 2010
Blurt Online: Tesco, T&G book feature Accessed July 6, 2010
Outsight Radio Hours: 2010 radio interview

American male singers
1955 births
Singers from Michigan
American punk rock singers
Living people
The Meatmen members